Khandaker Nurul Islam (died 11 July 2001), also known by his daak naam Nuru Mia, was a Bangladeshi politician and lawyer. He was a member of the country's first National Parliament as a member of the Awami League from the Faridpur-2 constituency.

Early life and education
Islam was born into a Bengali Muslim family of Khandakars in Faridpur. His father's name was Khandaker Abdul Barik. Islam's educational qualifications include a Bachelor of Laws and Master of Arts degree.

Career
Islam contested in the 1970 Pakistani general election as an Awami League candidate, and successfully won a seat in the NE-106 (Dacca-III) constituency. However, the assembly was not formed and later led to the Bangladesh Liberation War. During the first set of elections in the newly-established country in 1973, Islam preserved his seat in the Jatiya Sangsad as a Bangladesh Awami League candidate from Faridpur-2.

Death and legacy
Islam died on 11 July 2001 in Bangladesh. He was married to Hasina Momtaz and their son, Khandaker Mosharraf Hossain, is a parliamentarian and former minister. Their other son, Khandaker Mohtesham Hossain, is the chairman of the Faridpur Sadar Upazila Council.

References

Awami League politicians
People from Faridpur District
1st Jatiya Sangsad members
2001 deaths